Claudia Tausend (born 22 July 1964) is a German politician of the Social Democratic Party (SPD) who has been serving as a member of the Bundestag from the state of Bavaria since 2013.

Early life 
Tausend was born in Vilsbiburg, Bavaria,

Career 
Tausend first became a member of the Bundestag in the 2013 German federal election, representing the Munich East district. In parliament, she is a member of the Committee on Construction, Housing, Urban Development and Communities and the Committee on European Union Affairs.

In the negotiations to form a so-called traffic light coalition of the SPD, the Green Party and the FDP under Chancellor Olaf Scholz following the 2021 federal elections, Tausend was part of her party's delegation in the working group on building and housing, chaired by Kevin Kühnert, Christian Kühn and Daniel Föst.

Within the SPD parliamentary group, Tausend belongs to the Parliamentary Left, a left-wing movement.

References

External links 

  
 Bundestag biography 

1964 births
Living people
Members of the Bundestag for Bavaria
Female members of the Bundestag
21st-century German women politicians
Members of the Bundestag 2021–2025
Members of the Bundestag 2017–2021
Members of the Bundestag 2013–2017
Members of the Bundestag for the Social Democratic Party of Germany
People from Vilsbiburg